Gilles Canouet (born 20 January 1976 in Rueil-Malmaison) is a former French road racing cyclist.

Palmares
2001
1st Tour de Gironde
1st stage 2
2005
1st La Roue Tourangelle

References

1976 births
Living people
French male cyclists